Mammutland is a 2002 and 2004 broadcast animated series produced by KI.KA and ZDF. It originated in German-French-British cooperation and is based on the content of The Way Things Work by David Macaulay.

Content
Each episode provides topics from science and technology and explains the physical basis of many everyday phenomena and machines through drawings and animations.

The series is set on an island, living on the mammoth. To an inventor is working with the residents and with the assistance of the mammoths as a workhorse machines that facilitate the everyday life or to solve problems such as a collapsed bridge or a fire. They apply mainly to physical principles of mechanics, for example, the inclined plane, magnetism or thermodynamics.

Production and Publication
The series was produced in 2003 and 2004 from Millimages, Pearson Broadband, Schlessinger Media and ZDF. Directed by Diego Zamora and wrote the screenplays Simon Jowett and Alastair Swinnerton. Peter Lustig, announced the program presented by dandelions in the German version, the 26 episodes of the show, sang the title song and synchronized to the inventor.

The series was of 24 August 2004 to 28 September 2004 Ki.Ka broadcast in Germany and later by an ORF in Austria. She also appeared on DVD.

See also
List of German television series

External links
 

2002 German television series debuts